Donegal Township is a township in Butler County, Pennsylvania, United States. The population was 1,864 at the 2010 census.

It was named after the town and county of Donegal in Ireland.

Geography
Donegal Township is located along the eastern edge of Butler County, with Armstrong County to the east. The township nearly surrounds the borough of Chicora in the north.
 

Demographics

As of the census of 2000, there were 1,722 people, 598 households, and 452 families residing in the township.  The population density was 74.9 people per square mile (28.9/km2).  There were 623 housing units at an average density of 27.1/sq mi (10.5/km2).  The racial makeup of the township was 99.36% White, 0.29% African American, 0.06% Native American, 0.06% Asian, 0.06% from other races, and 0.17% from two or more races. Hispanic or Latino of any race were 0.52% of the population.

There were 598 households, out of which 38.1% had children under the age of 18 living with them, 65.6% were married couples living together, 6.7% had a female householder with no husband present, and 24.4% were non-families. 22.6% of all households were made up of individuals, and 10.9% had someone living alone who was 65 years of age or older.  The average household size was 2.71 and the average family size was 3.18.

In the township the population was spread out, with 26.2% under the age of 18, 5.9% from 18 to 24, 27.6% from 25 to 44, 22.5% from 45 to 64, and 17.8% who were 65 years of age or older.  The median age was 38 years. For every 100 females there were 98.6 males.  For every 100 females age 18 and over, there were 94.5 males.

The median income for a household in the township was $43,355, and the median income for a family was $52,083. Males had a median income of $40,170 versus $22,083 for females. The per capita income for the township was $17,012.  About 4.3% of families and 6.0% of the population were below the poverty line, including 8.4% of those under age 18 and 5.9% of those age 65 or over.

Education
Karns City Area School District - public school
Karns City High School

References

Populated places established in 1794
Townships in Butler County, Pennsylvania
1794 establishments in Pennsylvania